Finstock railway station serves the village of Finstock and the hamlet of Fawler in Oxfordshire, England. It is some distance from Finstock itself, being situated to the north-east of Charlbury Road (the present B4022), which crosses the line on an overbridge.

The station and all trains serving it are operated by Great Western Railway. Finstock is the least used station in Oxfordshire according to the official passenger statistics.

Finstock railway station featured in Geoff Marshall's YouTube series of Least Used Stations where his special guest was Ben Goldacre.

History
The station was opened by the Great Western Railway (GWR) on 9 April 1934, originally being named "Finstock Halt" and having two platforms. Each platform was approached by an inclined path from Charlbury Road, and each had a corrugated iron shelter with windows only in the end walls.

On 5 May 1969 it was renamed "Finstock". The line was singled on 29 November 1971, the former up line now carrying traffic in both directions, and the redundant down platform was removed. By September 1980 the former GWR waiting shelter had been replaced by a simple shelter open on three sides. On 9 March 1987 the former up platform was taken out of use and replaced by one built over the site of the former down line. Evidence of the former up platform and access ramp is now overgrown.

Services
Since at least February 1999 the station has been served by a minimal service of two trains per day, one in each direction.

There are currently no weekend services at the station with a normal service running on most Bank Holidays.

References

 

Railway stations in Oxfordshire
DfT Category F2 stations
Former Great Western Railway stations
Railway stations in Great Britain opened in 1934
Railway stations served by Great Western Railway